Cell cycle checkpoint protein RAD17 is a protein that in humans is encoded by the RAD17 gene.

Function 

The protein encoded by this gene is highly similar to the gene product of Schizosaccharomyces pombe rad17, a cell cycle checkpoint gene required for cell cycle arrest and DNA damage repair in response to DNA damage. This protein shares strong similarity with DNA replication factor C (RFC), and can form a complex with RFCs. This protein binds to chromatin prior to DNA damage and is phosphorylated by ATR after the damage. This protein recruits the RAD1-RAD9-HUS1 checkpoint protein complex onto chromatin after DNA damage, which may be required for its phosphorylation. The phosphorylation of this protein is required for the DNA-damage-induced cell cycle G2 arrest, and is thought to be a critical early event during checkpoint signaling in DNA-damaged cells. Eight alternatively spliced transcript variants of this gene, which encode four distinct proteins, have been reported.

Interactions 

RAD17 has been shown to interact with:

 Ataxia telangiectasia and Rad3 related,
 Ataxia telangiectasia mutated, 
 HUS1, 
 NHP2L1, 
 POLE, 
 RAD1 homolog,  and
 RAD9A.

References

Further reading